Eurema floricola, the Malagasy grass yellow, is a butterfly in the family Pieridae. It is found in Sierra Leone, Ivory Coast, Ghana, Nigeria, the Democratic Republic of Congo, Burundi, Kenya, Tanzania, Zambia and on Madagascar, the Comoros, Mauritius, Réunion and the Seychelles. Its habitat consists of the forest/savanna transition zone.

The larvae feed on Desmanthus virgatus, Caesalpinia bonducella, Leucaena glauca, Mimosa and Entada species.

Subspecies
Eurema floricola floricola (Madagascar, eastern Tanzania)
Eurema floricola aldabrensis Bernardi, 1969 (Seychelles)
Eurema floricola anjuana (Butler, 1879) (Comoros)
Eurema floricola ceres (Butler, 1886) (Mauritius, Reunion)
Eurema floricola leonis (Butler, 1886) (Sierra Leone, Ivory Coast, Ghana, Nigeria, Democratic Republic of Congo, Burundi, Kenya, western Tanzania, Zambia)

References

Butterflies described in 1833
floricola
Butterflies of Africa